Iskradata 1680 was a computer developed by Iskradata in 1979.

References

Microcomputers